BBC Sessions and Other Polished Turds is a compilation album by The Vandals, released August 12, 2008 by Kung Fu Records. It was released as a digital download through iTunes and the band's website, as well as on CD in Japan, and finally on CD and Vinyl in the US in 2019. The album collects rare songs by the band from compilations and out-of-print singles, as well as five songs recorded during various sessions at the BBC. It was promoted as "A collection of the band's most rare tracks all sharing one thing in common in that they were recorded when the band didn't give a crap, so they are fun, funny, and unpretentious".

Included are cover versions of songs by the Ramones, Little Jimmy Osmond, the Falling Idols (in which Vandals singer Dave Quackenbush played guitar before joining the Vandals), Supernova, Jilted John, Alice Cooper, Sublime, ZZ Top, and Queen, as well as a cover of the song "Heigh-Ho" from the Walt Disney film Snow White and the Seven Dwarfs which originally appeared on a Japanese Disney tribute album.

In fact, only four of the album's sixteen songs were written by The Vandals. "Change the World with My Hockey Stick" originally appeared on the soundtrack album to the film Glory Daze. The BBC sessions include performances of "My Neck, My Back" from the band's album Hollywood Potato Chip and "Canine Euthanasia" from The Quickening. The album's final track is a remix of "You're Not the Boss of Me (Kick It)" from the album Look What I Almost Stepped In...

The band described the album in typical tongue-in-cheek fashion:

Some may think this is a joke, or a hoax, but over the years the Vandals have indeed recorded over a dozen songs for the BBC, mostly for BBC 1’s Lock-Up Sessions with Mike Davis. Here are some of the best from those sessions featuring some ZZ Top, Sublime, Queen, and a tear jerking piano version of the dead pet lament "Canine Euthanasia."
The cover songs come from ancient Ramones tributes (try to find any better Ramones renditions than these – impossible), lame Alice Cooper tribute albums, and even a Japanese Disney tribute. The gayest of the gay, however, has to be the Vandals version of the song 9 year-old Jimmy Osmond topped the U.K. pop charts with for 6 weeks in 1972 "Long Haired Lover From Liver Pool." Think of this release as 20 years of people asking for extra songs and the Vandals delivering in their own special way.

Track listing

Personnel
Dave Quackenbush – lead vocals
Warren Fitzgerald – guitar, backing vocals, lead vocals on "Long Haired Lover from Liverpool" and "Don't Stop Me Now"
Joe Escalante – bass guitar, backing vocals
Josh Freese – drum kit, lead vocals on "Costa Mesa Hates Me"
Scott Aukerman – backing vocals on "Heigh-Ho"

References 

The Vandals albums
2008 compilation albums
2008 live albums
BBC Radio recordings